White County Central School District is a public school district based in unincorporated White County, Arkansas, United States, near the Providence community, north of Judsonia. The district encompasses  of land including a small northwestern portion of the city limits of Judsonia (the majority of the city being served by the Riverview School District). Schools in the district provide early childhood, elementary and secondary education to Providence and Steprock, as well as surrounding unincorporated communities in central White County along the Arkansas Highway 157 corridor, and near Pangburn and Bald Knob.

Schools
 White County Central High School, located north of Judsonia and serving more than 250 students in grades 7 through 12.
 White County Central Elementary School, located north of Judsonia and serving more than 425 students in pre-kindergarten through grade 6.

References

External links
 
 

School districts in Arkansas
Education in White County, Arkansas